Mark-Anthony Turnage CBE (born 10 June 1960) is a British composer of classical music.

Biography
Turnage was born in Corringham, Essex. He began composing at age nine and at fourteen began studying at the junior section of the Royal College of Music. 

His initial musical studies were with Oliver Knussen, John Lambert, and later with Gunther Schuller. He also has been strongly influenced by jazz, in particular by the work of Miles Davis, and has composed works featuring jazz performers, including John Scofield, Peter Erskine, John Patitucci, and Joe Lovano.

Turnage has composed numerous orchestral and chamber works, and three full-length operas. Greek, composed with the encouragement of Hans Werner Henze and first performed in 1988 at the Munich Biennale, is based on Steven Berkoff's adaptation of Oedipus Rex. The Silver Tassie, first performed in 2000, is based on the play by Seán O'Casey. Anna Nicole, with a libretto by Richard Thomas and first performed in 2011, relates the rise and fall of Playboy model and media celebrity Anna-Nicole Smith. His opera for family audiences, Coraline, is based on the dark fantasy novel by Neil Gaiman, and was staged by The Royal Opera at the Barbican Theatre in 2018.  His operas have been performed around the world including notably by New York City Opera (2013), Opernhaus Zurich (2019), Theater Dortmund (2013), Theater Freiburg (2018) and the Opera de Lille (2018).

Other works include Three Screaming Popes (after the paintings by Francis Bacon), Your Rockaby (a concerto for saxophone and orchestra), Yet Another Set To (a concerto for trombone and orchestra, dedicated to Christian Lindberg), and From the Wreckage (a concerto for trumpet and orchestra, written for Håkan Hardenberger). Blood on the Floor (1993–1996), for jazz quartet and large ensemble, contains nine sections with a shared theme of drug addiction, the section titled "Elegy for Andy" being a lament for the loss of his brother in a drug-related death. 
More recent Turnage scores have included the orchestral work Remembering, conducted by Simon Rattle in 2017 with the London Symphony Orchestra and Berlin Philharmonic; double violin concerto Shadow Walker for soloists Vadim Repin and Daniel Hope, performed by the Borusan Istanbul Philharmonic Orchestra in 2018; and Testament (2018), his setting of Ukrainian texts for soprano and orchestra. He has composed song cycles for a number of celebrated singers including Sarah Connolly, Gerald Finley and Allan Clayton.

Turnage’s work Blood on the Floor was choreographed by Wayne McGregor for Paris Opera Ballet in 2011 and in the same year he composed the score for Undance, collaborating with McGregor and visual artist Mark Wallinger. In 2012 Trespass, a ballet choreographed by Christopher Wheeldon and Alistair Marriott with score by Turnage, was first performed by The Royal Ballet. In 2017 he composed the score for Strapless, choreographed by Christopher Wheeldon for The Royal Ballet. Other choreographers that have made ballets to Turnage’s works include Heinz Spoerli (Zurich Ballet 2007 and Staatsballet Berlin 2012), Ashley Page (Rambert Dance Company 2013), Jorma Elo (Hubbard Street Dance Chicago 2007) and Gregor Zollig (Tanztheater Bielefeld 2006).

Turnage was the first Radcliffe Composer in Association with the City of Birmingham Symphony Orchestra from 1989 until 1993 and between 2000 and 2003 was the BBC Symphony Orchestra's first Associate Composer. He was Composer in Residence with the London Philharmonic Orchestra from 2005 until 2010. Between 2006 and 2010, Turnage was a co-composer-in-residence of the Chicago Symphony Orchestra, a position he held alongside Argentinian composer Osvaldo Golijov.

In Autumn 2005, he was appointed the Royal College of Music's Research Fellow in Composition.  In 2015 he was appointed a Commander of the Order of the British Empire (CBE) for his services to music.

His partner is the director Rachael Hewer.

Works

Opera

Ballet
From All Sides (2005–06)
L'Anatomie De La Sensation (2011)
Undance (2011)
Trespass (2012)
Strapless (2016 revised 2017)

Orchestral
Night Dances (1981), for offstage string quintet, solo instrumental group and orchestra
Three Screaming Popes (1988–89)
Some Days (1989), song cycle for mezzo-soprano and orchestra
Momentum (1990–1991)
Drowned Out (1992–1993)
Your Rockaby (1992–93), for soprano saxophone and orchestra
Dispelling the Fears (1993–1994, rev. 1995), for two trumpets and orchestra
Scorched (1996–2001), for jazz trio and orchestra
Still Sleeping (1997)
Evening Songs (1998)
Silent Cities (1998)
About Time (1999–2000), for ensemble and chamber orchestra of period instruments
Another Set To (1999–2000), concerto for trombone and orchestra
A Quick Blast (2000), for orchestral winds, brass and percussion
Dark Crossing (2000), for chamber orchestra
Etudes and Elegies (2000–2002)
Four-Horned Fandango (2000), for four horns and orchestra
On Opened Ground (2000–2001), concerto for viola and orchestra
Uninterrupted Sorrow (2000–2001)
Fractured Lines (2001), double concerto for two percussion and orchestra
When I Woke (2001), for baritone and chamber orchestra
A Quiet Life (2002), for string orchestra
A Man Descending (2003), for tenor saxophone and chamber orchestra
Riffs and Refrains (2003), concerto for clarinet and orchestra
Scherzoid (2003–04)
A Soothing Interlude (2004), for trombone and orchestra
From the Wreckage (2004), concerto for trumpet and orchestra
Yet Another Set To (2004), concerto for trombone and orchestra
Ceres (2005)
Hidden Love Song (2005), for soprano saxophone and chamber orchestra
Juno (2005)
Lullaby for Hans (2005), for string orchestra
Three Asteroids (2005)
The Torino Scale (2005)
From All Sides (2005–06)
A Prayer Out of Stillness (2007), concertante for double bass (doubling bass guitar) and string orchestra
Chicago Remains (2007)
Five Views of a Mouth (2007), concerto for flute and orchestra
Mambo, Blues and Tarantella (2007), concerto for violin and orchestra
Texan Tenebrae (2009)
Hammered Out (2010)
Cello Concerto (2010)
Speranza (2011–12)
Canon Fever (2012), premiered at the opening night of the 2012 BBC Proms.
 Frieze (2013) BBC co-commission with the Royal Philharmonic Society and the New York Philharmonic
 Erskine (2013), concerto for drum set and orchestra
 Passchendaele (2013)
 Piano Concerto (2013)
 Dialogue (2014), for violin and cello soloists, strings, percussion, harp and piano
 Håkan (2014), for trumpet and orchestra
 Martland Memorial (2014–15), for percussion and orchestra
 Remembering (2016), for orchestra
 Shadow Walker (2017), double concerto for two violins and orchestra
 Symphonic Movements (2017), for orchestra
 Towards Alba (2017-18), for horn and orchestra
 Time Flies (2019), for orchestra
 Go For It (2019), for orchestra
 Last Song for Olly (reduced version) (2018 arr.2020), reduced version for orchestra
 Up for Grabs (2020), for jazz trio and orchestra
 Cortege for Bernard Haitink (2021), for orchestra

Choral
The Game Is Over (2001–2002), for S.A.T.B. choir and orchestra
A Relic of Memory (2003), for S.A.T.B. choir and orchestra
Calmo (2003), for a cappella S.A.T.B. choir and bells
Two Fanfares and a Lament (2003), for S.A.T.B. choir and large ensemble
Christmas Night (2006), for S.A.T.B. choir and piano
Claremont Carol (2006), for upper-voice choir and piano or organ
Miserere Nobis (2006), for a cappella S.A.T.B. choir
At Sixes and Sevens (2012), for soprano and baritone soloists, youth chorus and chamber orchestra
Hibiki (2014), for two solo voices, children's chorus and orchestra (world premiere: Tokyo, 11 December 2016; European premiere: London, BBC Proms, 14 August 2017)
 Sing out loud (2017), two Welsh part songs for a cappella male chorus

Chamber
On All Fours (1985), for chamber ensemble
Sarabande (1986), for soprano saxophone and piano
Release (1987), for soprano saxophone, alto saxophone, bass clarinet, trumpet, trombone, percussion, piano and double bass
Kai (1989–1990), for cello solo and ensemble
Three Farewells (1989–1990), for flute, bass clarinet, harp and string quartet
Set To (1992–1993), for brass dectet
This Silence (1992–1993), for clarinet, bassoon, horn and string quintet
Blood on the Floor (1993–1996), for jazz quartet and large ensemble
Barrie's Deviant Fantasy (1995), for string quartet and referee's whistles
Bass Invention (1999–2000), for double bass solo and ensemble
Cantilena (2001), for oboe quintet
Snapshots (2002), for large ensemble
Crying Out Loud (2003), for large ensemble
A Short Procession (2003), for piano trio
Eulogy (2003), for viola solo and small ensemble
No Let Up (2003), for ensemble
 Three Trios (2003-05), for piano trio
 Carnac (2004), for Bb Clarinet and piano
 A Few Serenades (2004), for cello and piano
A Slow Pavane (2004–2005), for piano trio
A Fast Stomp (2005), for piano trio
Bleak Moments (2005), for horn and string quartet
Fanfare (from all sides) (2006), for brass ensemble
Returning (2006), for string sextet
Tango (2007), for ensemble
Out of Black Dust (2007–08), for brass ensemble
Four Chants (2008), for violin and piano
Twisted Blues with Twisted Ballad (2008), for string quartet
Grazioso! (2009), for small ensemble
Five Processionals (2009), for clarinet, violin, cello and piano
 Hilary's Hoedown (2009) encore for violin and piano
GG (2010), for cello and percussion
Three for Two (2010), for piano quartet
Amelia's March (2010), for small ensemble
Silem (2010), for solo trumpet and big band
Undance (2011), for ensemble
Johnston (2011), for two cellos
Falling Apart (2012), for clarinet and piano 
Contusion (2013), for string quartet
Run Riot (2013), for saxophone quartet
Power Play (2014), for viola and piano
 Maya (2014), for solo cello and chamber orchestra
Duetti d’Amore (2015), for violin and cello
Shroud (2016), for string quartet
Seven Pint-Sized Pieces (2016), for violin and piano
Prussian Blue (2016), Quintet for piano, violin, viola, cello and double bass
Winter’s Edge (2016), for string quartet
Cleethorpes Chorale (2017), for solo violin and piano
Massarosa (2018), for bassoon quintet
Nocturne (2018), for trumpet and strings
Romanian Rhapsody (2018), for solo violin and ensemble
Lament (2018-19), for solo violin and string orchestra
A Furious Fanfare (2019), for trumpet, horn, trombone and percussion
Chorale (2020), for flute, bass clarinet, viola and cello
Split Apart (2020), for string quartet
Uli (2021), for eight players

Vocal
Lament for a Hanging Man (1983), for soprano and ensemble
Some Days (1989), song cycle for mezzo-soprano and orchestra
Greek Suite (1989), for mezzo-soprano, tenor soli and ensemble
The Torn Fields (2000–2002), song cycle for baritone and large ensemble
When I Woke (2001), song cycle for baritone and orchestra
Two Baudelaire Songs (2003–04), for soprano and ensemble
About Water (2006), for solo jazz singer; soprano, mezzo-soprano, tenor, bass soli; solo instrumental septet and large ensemble
A Constant Obsession (2007), song cycle for tenor and ensemble
Bellamy (2008), for countertenor and singing harpist
In The Bleak Mid-Winter (arr. 2010) arranged for voice, harp, cello and double bass
Testament (2017), cantata for solo soprano and orchestra
Refugee (2018), for tenor and chamber orchestra
Black Milk (2019), for jazz singer and sixteen players
Owl Songs (2019), for soprano and eight players
Without Ceremony (2019), for baritone and piano
Of Nature’s Light (2020), song cycle for mezzo-soprano and piano
Silenced (2020), for tenor and piano
Songs of Sleep and Regret (2020), for mezzo soprano and piano

Solo instrumental
An Aria (with Dancing) (2004), for trumpet
Ah, Quegli Occhi! (2006), for soprano saxophone
Air with Variations (2007), for guitar
Cradle Song (2009), for clarinet
Milo (2009), for solo cello
Leap (2010), for clarinet
Four Meditations (2018), for solo harp
 On Marylebone Road (2019) for solo piano

Other
Anthem by Peter Erskine, ed. Turnage (1996), for jazz trio and chamber orchestra
 On the CD Music to Hear (Black Box, BBM 1065, 2001):
 Two Memorials (1997–2001)
 An Invention on "Solitude" (1997–98, rev. 1999)
 Sleep On (1992)
 Cortège for Chris (1997)
 Two Elegies Framing a Shout (1994)
 Three Farewells (1990)
 Tune for Toru (1995–1999)

References

External links
Mark-Anthony Turnage at Boosey & Hawkes (publisher)

Mark-Anthony Turnage introduction to his music, by Anthony Burton
Mark-Anthony Turnage at Schott Music Ltd.
Mark-Anthony Turnage biography on CDMC

1960 births
Living people
20th-century classical composers
20th-century English composers
20th-century British male musicians
21st-century classical composers
21st-century English composers
21st-century British male musicians
British ballet composers
English classical composers
English male classical composers
English opera composers
Male opera composers
Academics of the Royal College of Music
Deutsche Grammophon artists
Commanders of the Order of the British Empire
People from Corringham, Essex